is a Japanese anime studio, located in Suginami, Tokyo, Japan, known for its four magical-girl anime, especially Magical Princess Minky Momo. It was established by Toshihiko Sato and other artists on December 20, 1975, as Ashi Productions.  It changed its name from Ashi Productions to ' on November 1, 2007.  On February 12, 2019, the company changed its name back to Ashi Productions.

TV series 
 Blocker Gundan 4 Machine Blaster (1976-1977, co-production with Nippon Animation)
 Chogattai Majutsu Robo Ginguiser (1977, co-production with Nippon Amimation)
 Petit Ange (1977–1978) 
 Josephina the Whale (1979, co-production with Kokusai Eiga-sha)
 Zukkoke Knight - Don De La Mancha (1980, co-production with Kokusai Eiga-sha)
 Monchhichi Twins (1980, co-production with Kokusai Eiga-sha)
 Space Warrior Baldios (1980–1981, co-production with Kokusai Eiga-sha) 
 GoShogun (1981)
 Magical Princess Minky Momo (1982–1983)
 Special Armored Battalion Dorvack (1983–1984)
 Dancouga – Super Beast Machine God (1985)
 Machine Robo: Revenge of Cronos (1986–1987)
 Machine Robo: Battle Hackers (1987)
 Ironfist Chinmi (1988)
 Doctor Chichibuyama (1988)
 Sonic Soldier Borgman (1988)
 Idol Densetsu Eriko (1989–1990)
 Time Travel Tondekeman (1989–1990, co-production with Tatsunoko Production)
 Idol Angel Yokoso Yoko (1990–1991)
 NG Knight Ramune & 40 (1990-1991)
 Magical Angel Sweet Mint (1990–1991)
 Jankenman (1991–1992)
 Magical Princess Minky Momo: Hold on to Your Dreams (1991–1992)
 Floral Magician Mary Bell (1992–1993)
 Free Kick (1992–1993)
 Macross 7 (1994–1995)
 Blue Seed (1994–1995, co-production with Production I.G)
 Jura Tripper (1995)
 H2 (1995-1996)
 The Legend of Zorro (1996–1997)
 VS Knight Lamune & 40 Fire (1996)
 Beast Wars II: Super Life-Form Transformers (1998)
 All Purpose Cultural Cat Girl Nuku Nuku (1998)
 Gandalla (1998)
 Cyber Team in Akihabara (1998, co-production with Gansis)
 Cybuster (1999)
 Super Life-Form Transformers: Beast Wars Neo (1999)
 Offside (2001–2002)
 F-Zero GP Legend (2003–2004)
 Ultra Maniac (2003)
 Jūsō Kikō Dancouga Nova (2007)
 Onsen Yōsei Hakone-chan (2015, co-production with Asahi Production)
 Rainbow Days (2016)
 In Another World with My Smartphone (2017)
 Cutie Honey Universe (2018)
 The Tale of the Outcasts (2023)

TV specials
 Attention Students! A Green Neckerchief for Your Hearts (February 23, 1986)

OVAs 
 Dancouga: Requiem for Victims (1986)
 Dancouga: Jūsenkitai Songs (1986)
 Violence Jack: Harem Bomber (1986) 
 God Bless Dancouga (1987)
 Makyō Gaiden La Deus (1987)
 Magical Princess Minky Momo Hitomi no Seiza Minky Momo SONG Special (1987)
 Leina: Wolf Sword Legend (1988–1989)
 Dancouga: Blazing Epilogue (1989–1990)
 Machine Robo: Battle Field Memories (1989)
 Lightning Trap: Leina & Laika (1990)
 Gadurine (1990)
 Camelot of Love and Sword (1990)
 NG Knight Lamune & 40 Summary (1990)
 NG Knight Lamune & 40 EX (1991)
 Jankenman Kaiju Dai Kessen (1992)
 Tinkerbell After School (1992)
 Mega Man: Upon a Star (1993)
 NG Knight Lamune & 40 DX (1993)
 Idol Defense Force Hummingbird (1993)
 Humming Bird: Summer 1994 (1994) 
 Magical Princess Minky Momo: In the Station of Your Memories (1994)
 Iria: Zeiram the Animation (1994)
 New Cutie Honey (1994, episode 3)
 Humming Bird: Song of the Wind (1995)
 Humming Bird: The Space of Your Dream (1995)
 Apocalypse Zero (1996)
 Jewel BEM Hunter Lime (1996–1997)
 Macross Dynamite 7 (1997–1998)
 Knights of Ramune (1997)
 All Purpose Cultural Cat Girl Nuku Nuku DASH! (1998)
 Kirara (2000)
 Ultra Maniac (2002)
 Futari Ecchi (2014)
 Jewelpet Attack Travel! (2022)

 Theatrical projects 
 Space Warrior Baldios (co-production with Kokusai Eiga-sha) (1981)
 GoShogun Movie (1982)
 GoShogun: The Time Étranger (1985)
 Magical Princess Minky Momo La Ronde in my Dream (1985)
 Vampire Hunter D (1985)
 Grey: Digital Target (1986)
 Ai City (1986)
 Ultraman: The Adventure Begins (1987)
 Sonic Soldier Borgman: The Final Battle (1989)
 Sonic Soldier Borgman: Lover's Rain (1990)
 Floral Magician Mary Bell: The Key Of Phoenix (1992)
 Jankenman Movie (1992)
 Floral Magician Mary Bell: Mary Bell's Traffic Safety (1993)
 Floral Magician Mary Bell: Mary Bell's Fire Prevention: What to Do When an Earthquake Occurs (1993)
 Beast Wars II: Lio Convoy's Close Call! (1998)

 Outsourced productions 
 Gigi and the Fountain of Youth (English dub of Magical Princess Minky Momo La Ronde in my Dream film by Harmony Gold) (1985)
 M.A.S.K. (American production, with DiC Entertainment; various first and second-season episodes) (1985–1986)
 Macron 1 (U.S./European version of GoShogun by Saban International, the U.S. version also incorporates scenes from Akū Dai Sakusen Srungle produced by Kokusai Eiga-sha.) (1986)
 Mega Man (American production, with Ruby-Spears Productions) (1993)
 Skysurfer Strike Force (American production, with Ruby-Spears Productions) (1995–1996)
 Diabolik'' (American production, with Saban International) (1997)

References

External links

 
Japanese companies established in 1975
Animation studios in Tokyo
Mass media companies established in 1975
Japanese animation studios
Suginami